The first series of Top Gear Australia was aired during 2008 on SBS One and consisted of eight episodes, beginning on 29 September and concluding on 17 November. The presenting line-up consisted of cartoonist Warren Brown, racing drivers Charlie Cox and Steve Pizzati, as well as the Australian cousin of the Stig. Based on the original UK version, the show's segments included "Power Laps", "Star in a Bog Standard Car", "What Where They Thinking?", "Old car commercials", "Stunts" and "V8 to the Rescue". The studio recordings took place at Bankstown Airport in Sydney. The power laps and the celebrity segments were recorded at Camden Airport with parts of the runways and taxiways used as a test track.

This was the only series to feature Cox as host, who left the show following series one. However, a second series was aired in 2009 due to the success of this series, with musician and episode 6 celebrity guest James Morrison replacing him.

Episodes

References

Top Gear Australia
2008 Australian television seasons
2008 Australian television series debuts